Maple Ridge-Mission is a provincial electoral district for the Legislative Assembly of British Columbia, Canada.  The riding's name was resurrected from a former riding in the same area, with similar but not identical boundaries (see History section).

Geography

Redistribution 
Maple Ridge-Pitt Meadows and Mission-Kent were created from Dewdney during the 1989 redistribution.  Whereas later in 2000, Mission-Kent and Maple Ridge-Pitt Meadows were used to create Maple Ridge-Mission.  Finally in the latest redistribution, 2008, just over half of the original riding remain and to it was added a fraction of Maple Ridge-Pitt Meadows.

History 
Its MLA was Randy Hawes under the former boundary system, who is a former mayor of the District of Mission. He was first elected in 2001,  representing the British Columbia Liberal Party.  He successfully ran again in the Abbotsford-Mission riding for the 2009 election.

Member of Legislative Assembly

Electoral history 

|-

|-

|NDP
|Mike Bocking
|align="right"|8,738
|align="right"|45.39%
|align="right"|
|-

|-

|- bgcolor="white"
!align="left" colspan=3|Total
!align="right"|19,252
!align="right"|100.00%
!align="right"|
|}

External links 
BC Stats - 2001 (pdf)
Results of 2001 election (pdf)
2001 Expenditures (pdf)
Website of the Legislative Assembly of British Columbia

References 

British Columbia provincial electoral districts
Maple Ridge, British Columbia
Mission, British Columbia
Provincial electoral districts in Greater Vancouver and the Fraser Valley